Stadio Tonino Benelli is an arena in Pesaro, Italy.  It is primarily used for football, and is the home to A.S.D. Vis Pesaro 1898 of Serie D. It opened in 1927 and holds 4,898 spectators.

References

Football venues in Italy